The 2nd Crunchyroll Anime Awards were held on February 24, 2018, honoring excellence in anime from 2017. The nominees were announced on January 18. Voting began on January 22, and was held in three separate rounds from January 22 to February 11. The winners were announced on February 24. It featured 17 categories. This edition made several changes from the previous one, including having six nominations for all categories instead of four. The awards for Best Couple, Best Fight Scene, and Most Heartwarming Scene were dropped. New categories were presented, including Best Score, Best Film, Best CGI, Best Continuing Series, and Best Slice of Life. It also marks the first (and currently, the only) time that an award was presented for a manga. 'Hero of the Year' and 'Villain of the Year' awards were renamed as "Best Hero" and "Best Villain" awards respectively. A special category, the Industry Icon Award, was presented for the first time to honor influential figures in the industry and the art.

My Hero Academia led the nominations with ten, eventually winning seven of it. My Hero Academia and Descending Stories: Showa Genroku Rakugo Shinju were nominated for the Anime of the Year award for the second straight time. My Hero Academias Izuku Midoriya won the Best Hero award for the second straight time as well. The awards for Best Boy and Best Girl saw two nominations from the same franchise. Your Name won in the Best Film category, while My Lesbian Experience With Loneliness won Best Manga. Made in Abyss won the Anime of the Year, as well as Best Score.

The inaugural Industry Icon Award was given to voice actor Christopher Sabat for his English voice works on anime such as Vegeta and Piccolo of the Dragon Ball franchise and All Might of My Hero Academia. The awards were presented at the Ricardo Montalban Theater in Los Angeles. It is a live show hosted by Anthony Carboni and Erika Ishii. Several prominent personalities of the western anime community, including some anime YouTubers, were invited to present the awards.

Winners and nominees

Statistics

References

2018 awards in the United States
Crunchyroll
February 2018 events in the United States